Karlivka (Ukrainian ) is the name of several places in Ukraine:

Cities:
 Karlivka - city which is the center of the Karlivka district in Poltava Oblast, Ukraine.

Villages:
 Karlivka - a village in the Maryinka district, Donetsk Oblast, Ukraine. 
 Karlivka - a village in the Nova Odesa district, Mykolaiv Oblast, Ukraine.

Districts:
 Karlivka district - in Poltava Oblast, Ukraine